The Lenovo ThinkPad X220 is a laptop computer from the ThinkPad series that was manufactured by Lenovo.
It uses a 12.5 inch IPS or TN display.

A tablet version was also released.

Modifications 
The keyboard from the X220 has been retrofitted in a X230.

References

External links 

 Arch Linux wiki - X220
 Thinkwiki.de - X220

Lenovo